Hayastan was an Armenian public and political daily newspaper published from April 1917 to February 1918 in Tbilisi (Tiflis) by General Andranik.

History
The editors were Vahan Totovents and Levon Tutunjian. Hovhannes Tumanian supported daily's publication. The daily was related to National Council of Western Armenians and genocide refugees, defensed their interests. The daily started a new political movement led by Andranik. 

Hayastan frequently published articles by Andranik and Tumanian.

References

Newspapers published in Georgia (country)
Armenian-language newspapers
Mass media in Tbilisi
Publications established in 1917
1917 establishments in Georgia (country)